was a Japanese children's book author. He was born in Tokyo Prefecture, and attended Waseda University.

Bibliography
Yan
Majin no umi, about the Menashi-Kunashir Battle, winner of the Japanese Association of Writers for Children Prize in 1970
Okaasan no umareta ie
Kiseki kurabu
Fushigi na furoshiki tsuzumi

See also

Japanese literature 
List of Japanese authors

External links
English-language page on Majin no umi

Japanese children's writers
People from Tokyo
1921 births
2003 deaths
Recipients of the Medal with Purple Ribbon